Šušak is a Croatian surname and may refer to:
 Gojko Šušak (1945–1998), Croatian politician
 Ivo Šušak (born 1948), Croatian football manager
 Milan Šušak (born 1984), Australian footballer of Serbian descent

References

Croatian surnames